MDR Kultur is a German public radio station owned and operated by Mitteldeutscher Rundfunk (MDR).

References

Mitteldeutscher Rundfunk
Radio stations in Germany
Radio stations established in 1992
1992 establishments in Germany
Mass media in Halle (Saale)